Widow Qing (259–210 BC) was a Chinese businesswoman.

She belonged to the family who controlled the cinnabar mines in Changshou, which she managed herself as a widow. She is foremost known in history for her good business relationship to Emperor Qin Shi Huang, over whom she wielded a great deal of influence because of their business transactions and her substantial economic power.

She has been the subject of a TV-series in China.

References

250s BC births
210 BC deaths
3rd-century BC Chinese women
3rd-century BC Chinese people
Ancient businesswomen
Ancient businesspeople
Chinese mining businesspeople